John Lambert may refer to:

John Lambert (martyr) (died 1538), English Protestant martyred during the reign of Henry VIII
John Lambert (general) (1619–1684), Parliamentary general in the English Civil War
John Lambert of Creg Clare (fl. c. 1645 – c. 1669), Irish soldier and Royalist
Sir John Lambert, 1st Baronet (1666–1723), French-born English merchant
John Lambert (politician) (1746–1823), U.S. senator from and Acting Governor of New Jersey
John Lambert (British Army officer) (1772–1847), British Army general and cricketer
John William Lambert (1860–1952), American automotive pioneer
John Lambert (civil servant) (1815–1892), British civil servant
John Lambert (composer) (1926–1995), British composer and teacher
John Lambert (diplomat) (1921–2015), British ambassador
John Laurence Lambert  (1936–2014), Australian educator and author
John Lambert (naval historian) (1937–2016), naval illustrator and author
Jack Lambert (American football) (John Harold Lambert, born 1952), American football player
John Lambert (basketball) (born 1953), American basketball player

See also
Jack Lambert (disambiguation)